The Siemens SL55 is a slider mobile phone released by Siemens in 2003. The phone has a sliding design, and features a WAP browser, Java support and T9 predictive typing. Camera functionality can be added by connecting the clip-on cam. The colours it was available in were ruby and titan. The Siemens SL56, is a variant of the SL55 designed for the American market. Unlike the SL55, the SL56 is a dualband phone.

Features 
 Display
 101x80 px resolution
 Colour, 12-bit colour depth
 Can display up to 7 lines of text
 Customizable colour scheme, wallpaper, screensavers
 Battery
 500 mAh lithium polymer battery
 Up to 3.5 hours of talk time, 200 hours standby time
 Connectivity
Infrared sensor
 WAP 1.2.1 mobile web browser
 EMS, SMS, MMS, e-mail (POP3, IMAP)
 Triband EGSM 900, GSM 1800/1900
 GPRS class 8 data technology
PC synchronization software
 Storage
 1.6 MB of storage
 Call records: 10 dialed, 10 received, 10 missed calls
 Up to 500 phonebook entries 
 Camera
 Can be used via the clip-on camera
 640x480 resolution
 Sound
Polyphonic ringtones
 Ringtone composer
 Voice memos, 20 voice commands, 20 voice dial numbers
 Other features
 User profiles
 Call records and address book
 2 pre-installed games (Rayman Golf and Mobile Tennis), more can be downloaded
 Calendar, alarm, clock, stopwatch, timer, notes, to-do list, reminders
 Unit and currency converter, calculator
 Java MIDP 1.0 support
 SMS templates
SyncML support
 Conference calling, loudspeaker

Reception
Reviewers praised its compact size and considered the rounded form of the device to be interesting. The quality of the screen was considered to be average, and its keyboard to be comfortable to type on. The reviewers liked the features and ease of use of the device, the fashion design, and that it had many features for its compact size, but didn't like the slow application loading speeds, the storage, and the clip-on camera, saying that the viewfinder of the camera is inaccurate, and the photo processing speed is slow.

Gallery

References

Mobile phones introduced in 2003
Siemens mobile phones
Mobile phones with infrared transmitter